The Municipal Court of Nauvoo was the judicial body of Nauvoo, Illinois from 1840 until 1845.

Establishment
The Nauvoo City Charter was passed by the Illinois Legislature on December 16, 1840. The legislature mandated that "The Municipal Court shall sit on the first Monday of every month, and the City Council at such times and place as may be prescribed by city ordinance; special meetings of which may at any time be called by the Mayor or any two Aldermen."

The Municipal Court could hear citizen appeals, with the charter saying: "Appeals may be had from any decision or judgment of said Mayor or Aldermen, arising under the city ordinances, to the Municipal Court under such regulations as may be presented by ordinance;"

The Act stated that the Municipal Court "shall be composed of the Mayor as Chief Justice, and the Aldermen as Associate Justices". According to the charter, "The Municipal Court shall have power to grant writs of habeas corpus in all cases arising under the ordinances of the City Council."

Members
 Chief Justice (Mayor)
 John C. Bennett February 1, 1841 – May 17, 1842
 Joseph Smith May 19, 1842 – June 27, 1844
 Chancy Robison

 Associate Justices (Aldermen)

 Daniel H. Wells (3 Feb. 1841 – 3 Feb. 1845)
 William Marks (3 Feb. 1841 – 6 Feb. 1843)
 Newel K. Whitney (3 Feb. 1841 – 6 Feb. 1843)
 Samuel H. Smith (3 Feb. 1841 – 23 May 1842)
 Gustavus Hills (23 Oct. 1841–6 Feb. 1843)
 Orson Spencer (23 Oct. 1841–3 Feb. 1845)
 George W. Harris (30 Oct. 1841–after 8 Feb. 1845)
 Hiram Kimball (30 Oct. 1841–6 Feb. 1843)
 George A. Smith (11 Feb. 1843–10 Aug. 1844)
 William D. Huntington (4 Sept. 1841–ca. 1846)
 Dimick B. Huntington (23 Oct. 1841–9 Apr. 1842), (23 May 1842–ca. 1846)
 William Clayton (9 Sept. 1842–ca. 1846)
 John Fullmer (4 Sept. 1841–9 Sept. 1842)
 Robert B. Thompson (3 Feb. 1841–27 Aug. 1841)
 Samuel Bennett (4 Mar. 1843– 3 Feb. 1845)

Notable cases
On August 8, 1842, the court released Smith and Rockwell after they were arrested and charged with the attempted assassination of Lilburn Boggs, former Governor of Missouri.

On July 1, 1843, the court intervened in a case against Joseph Smith. The Governor of Missouri issued a writ authorizing the arrest and extradition of Joseph Smith on the charge of treason.  The Governor charged Joseph H. Reynolds with arresting and conveying Smith to Daviess County, Missouri.   The Municipal Court of Nauvoo dismissed the charges against Smith.

In June 1844, the Circuit Court for Hancock County charged Joseph Smith, Hyrum Smith, and 15 other co-defendants with inciting a "riot" in the destruction of the Nauvoo Expositor. In response, the Municipal Court of Nauvoo dismissed all State charges (despite being a municipal, not state, court).

Abolition
In January 1845, the legislature repealed the Nauvoo Charter by a vote of 25-14 in the Senate and 75-31 in the House.  Nauvoo was dis-incorporated and its assets placed into a receivership.

See also
Nauvoo City Council

References

External links
 Testimonies Given before the Municipal Court of Nauvoo
 

Nauvoo, Illinois
Municipal courts